Harold's Planet is a popular online cartoon character created by Lisa Swerling & Ralph Lazar. 

Winner of the "Grand Prix - International Project Competition" at the Annecy Animation Festival in France in 1998, it grew to become a commercially successful cartoon property, selling as greetings cards in the millions. Harold's Planet appeared weekly in the Financial Times and The Scotsman from 2008 to 2009 and has appeared on a broad range of merchandise products.

Several Harold's Planet books have been published by Penguin Books & Time Warner Books. In 2001 Harold's Planet became exclusive e-card providers to Microsoft's UK Hotmail service, sending millions of viewers to the animated website.

Harold's Planet won the "Best Licensed Property" award at the UK GCA annual licensing awards in 2014.

In 2017 the South Australian Wine group CMV launched the Harold's Planet Wine for Yoga lovers range of wines, which are sold worldwide.

External links
 Company website
 Harold's Planet

British comic strips
Cartoon Network Studios animated films